Julie Sanders is the Principal of Royal Holloway, University of London.

Career 
Sanders gained her doctorate at the University of Warwick, and studied at Ca' Foscari University of Venice and at University of California, Berkeley. In 1995 she took a lectureship at Keele University and in 2004 joined the University of Nottingham as Chair of English Literature and Drama. She was Head of the School of English from 2010 to 2013 and was subsequently seconded for two years to the Ningbo, China, joint venture campus as Vice Provost, launching the Arts and Humanities Research Council's first centre in China for Digital Copyright and IT research. In 2015, Sanders was appointed Pro-Vice Chancellor for the Faculty of Humanities and Social Sciences at Newcastle University, and at the same institution she served as Deputy Vice-Chancellor from 2017 to 2022. Sanders was awarded the Rose Mary Crawshay Prize by the British Academy for international women’s scholarship.

Sanders has been a member of the expert panel on BBC Radio 4's In Our Time for "The Anatomy of Melancholy", "The History of Metaphor", "Elizabethan Revenge Tragedy – theatre of blood", "The Metaphysical Poets – sex and death in the 17th century" and "Pastoral Literature – the romantic idealisation of the countryside".

Selected publications

References 

Academics of Newcastle University
Alumni of the University of Warwick
British women academics
Living people
Year of birth missing (living people)